The German Electoral Coalition was a political alliance in Czechoslovakia representing Sudeten Germans.

History
The alliance was established for the 1929 elections as an alliance of the Farmers' League (BdL), the German Labour and Economic Community (DAWG) and the Carpathian German Party (KdP, led by Dr. Roland Steinacker). DAWG, in turn, was an alliance between DDFP (led by Prof. Bruno Kafka) and the DNP faction led by Dr. Alfred Rosche.

It received 5.4% of the national vote, winning 16 seats in the Chamber of Deputies and nine in the Senate. No candidate belonging to KdP was elected.

Results by district (Chamber of Deputies)

Senators elected
The senators elected were Carl Kostka (DAWG/DDFP), Franz Ickert (BdL), Josef Kahler (BdL), Andreas Lippert (BdL), Anton Lichtneckert (BdL), Josef Luksch (BdL), Adolf Scholz (BdL), Erdmann Spies (BdL) and Robert Stöhr (BdL).

References

Carpathian German people
German diaspora political parties
Interwar minority parties in Czechoslovakia
Political party alliances in Czechoslovakia